TF-1 cells are immortal cell line derived from the human Erythroleukemia used in biomedical research. This cells are proliferatively responsive to interleukin-3 (IL-3) or granulocyte-macrophage colony-stimulating factor (GM-CSF). TF-1 cells have gene fusion of CBFA2T3-ABHD12.

See also
Other cell lines in LL-100 panel

References

External links
Information on TF-1 in the ATCC catalog
Cellosaurus entry for TF-1

Human cell lines